Nibley Music Festival is an annual two day music festival that takes place in July in the village of North Nibley, Gloucester, UK. The Festival is held on the village cricket ground in the hills above the Severn Estuary, commanding views of up to 60 miles.

The Festival, formerly called North Nibley Music Festival, was first held in 2007 as a way of fundraising for local good causes and charities. The management and organisation of the festival is carried out by small team of volunteers working throughout the year, and about 150 extra volunteers around festival time. Since 2007 it has grown in size to a capacity of c. 4,500 people and now raises about £30-40k each year through a combination of ticket sales, sponsorship and encouraging local charitable groups to set up stalls on the festival site.

It showcases popular music across a wide variety of genres and the festival is aimed primarily at a family audience.
In 2013, the festival sold all of its tickets in less than an hour. This led to demands for the festival to grow in size, but as of 2014 this hasn't happened.

Bands that have played at Nibley in the past include The Wonderstuff, King Charles, Feeder, Jesus Jones, The Heavy, Scouting For Girls The Beat, Dodgy, The Christians and The Selecter.

References

External links 

 Official website

Music festivals in Gloucestershire